The 9th Delaware Infantry Regiment was an infantry regiment that served in the Union Army between August 30, 1864 and January 23, 1865, during the American Civil War.

Service 
The 9th Delaware Infantry Regiment was organized at Wilmington, Delaware, for a hundred-day service on August 30, 1864. Straight away it was assigned guard duty at Fort Delaware to guard prisoners. On January 23, 1865, it was mustered out. During its service the regiment lost eleven to disease.

See also

List of Delaware Civil War units

References

Bibliography 
 Dyer, Frederick H. (1959). A Compendium of the War of the Rebellion. New York and London. Thomas Yoseloff, Publisher. .

Units and formations of the Union Army from Delaware
1864 establishments in Delaware
Military units and formations established in 1864
Military units and formations disestablished in 1865